Seri or SERI may refer to:

People 
Jean Michaël Seri, an Ivorian professional footballer

Places 
Seri Yek-e Zarruk, Iran
Seri, Bheri, Nepal
Seri, Karnali, Nepal
Seri, Mahakali, Nepal
Seri, Raebareli, a village in Uttar Pradesh, India

Other
Seri people, an indigenous people of Mexico
Seri language
Samsung Economic Research Institute, a private-sector think tanks in South Korea
Solar Energy Research Institute, now called National Renewable Energy Laboratory
Seri, one of the bulls that carried the god Teshub in Hurrian mythology
Seri, trapdoors used in Kabuki theatres
Seri, or Japanese parsley
 Seri (fly), a genus of flies in the family Platypezidae